Travis Wetland is a wetland in the suburb of Burwood in Christchurch, New Zealand. An ecological restoration programme is being undertaken to restore the wetland. It covers 116 ha of land formerly drained and used as a dairy farm. In 2009 it won the "Urban Sustainability" category in the Green Ribbon Awards awarded by the Minister for the Environment.

In May 2010 the rare and endangered Canterbury mudfish were released into the wetland in the hope that they would become established.

See also
 Wetlands of New Zealand
 Environment of New Zealand

References

External links
 Travis Wetland website
 Travis Wetland, Christchurch City Council
 Travis Wetland fact-sheet, Christchurch City Council

Geography of Christchurch
Tourist attractions in Christchurch
Protected areas of Canterbury, New Zealand
Wetlands of Canterbury, New Zealand